The Sony Vaio W series is a series of netbooks, and formerly a series of desktop PCs.

All-in-one desktops (2002)
The Sony Vaio W series is a line of all-in-one PCs. It was first launched in Japan, and came to the U.S. market in October 2002, with the first model being PCV-W10. Combining features such as large multimedia speakers, foldable keyboards, a large 15.3 inch display, i.LINK, 1.6 GHz Pentium 4 CPUs with 512 MB RAM, and in some later models TV features, the W series was seen as a high-end multimedia series with great specs for its time. It was replaced by the Vaio L series in 2006.

Netbooks (2009)

The Sony Vaio W series name was relaunched in 2009 as a series of notebook computers. It is aimed primarily towards the youth market, creating a new market audience for Vaio. The product is intended to be mainly used for at home for browsing, sharing photos online, downloading music and online networking. It clearly differentiates itself from the existing notebook line-up and is not presented as a full PC.

Features 
10.1” 16:9 WXGA 1366×768 X-black LCD screen with LED backlights
2.6 lb.
Full pitch isolation keyboard
Intel Atom N280 processor at 1.66 GHz
Built in webcam and microphone
3 hour battery
Wireless b/g/n networking
Matching accessories (carry pouch and mouse accessory kit)

Models 
The models are made in three colors: pink, white, and brown. Their base price is (USD) $499.

References

External links
 Official Product Showcase
 Official Product Website
 Official Press Release

Netbooks
W
W
All-in-one desktop computers